Tinsel is a metallic material used for ornamentation, notably including Christmas decorations.

Tinsel may also refer to:

Tinsel (codename), a type of radio jamming equipment used during World War II
Tinsel (film), a 1918 silent film drama
Tinsel (novel), a 1979 novel by William Goldman
Tinsel (TV series), a Nigerian soap opera
Tinsel Dome, a small hill in Antarctica
Tinsel Korey (born 1980), Canadian actress
Tinsel, a member of the original Exiles

See also
Tinsel print, a rare type of old master print parts
Tinsel town (disambiguation)
Tinsel wire, a form of low-voltage electrical wire
Tinselfish, a family of fish
Calectasia, commonly called the tinsel lily
Catapaecilma elegans or common tinsel, a species of butterfly
 
Tensile
Tinshill, a suburb north of Leeds, West Yorkshire
Tinsley (disambiguation)